Dusan Hakaraia (born 30 May 1983) is a New Zealand former cricketer and coach. He played five first-class, six List A, and five Twenty20 matches for Auckland from 2010 to 2013. Hakaraia is from Croatian descent, and has also represented a New Zealand Croatia team.

See also
 List of Auckland representative cricketers

References

External links
 

1983 births
Living people
New Zealand cricketers
Auckland cricketers
Sportspeople from Honolulu
American cricketers